League tables for teams participating in Ykkönen, the second tier of the Finnish Soccer League system, in 2005.

League table

Promotion play-offs
RoPS as 13th placed team in the 2005 Veikkausliiga and VPS as runners-up of the 2005 Ykkönen competed in a two-legged play-off for a place in the Veikkausliiga. VPS won the play-offs on away goals (the teams finishing 1-1 on aggregate) and were promoted to the Veikkausliiga.

VPS Vaasa - RoPS Rovaniemi          0-0
RoPS Rovaniemi - VPS Vaasa          1-1

Relegation play-offs
SalPa Salo - FC Hämeenlinna         0-4
FC Hämeenlinna - SalPa Salo         3-1

Klubi-04 Helsinki - VG-62 Naantali  2-1
VG-62 Naantali - Klubi-04 Helsinki  3-2

Klubi-04 Helsinki were promoted to the Ykkönen and VG-62 Naantali relegated to the Kakkonen. Klubi-04 won on away goals.
FC Hämeenlinna remained in the Ykkönen after beating Salpa 7-1 on aggregate.

References

Ykkönen seasons
2005 in Finnish football
Fin
Fin